"Walking the Dog" (or "Walkin' the Dog") is a song written and performed by Rufus Thomas. It was released on his 1963 album Walking the Dog. It was his signature hit and also his biggest, reaching number 10 on the Billboard Hot 100 in December 1963 and remaining on the Hot 100 for 14 weeks.

Background
The Rufus Thomas version begins with the quoting of the first 14 notes of Mendelssohn's Wedding March from "Midsummer's Night's Dream".  This version is noted for Rufus whistling and calling out for his dog, to go walking with him.  The lyrics make references to children's nursery rhymes, especially Miss Mary Mack.

The Dennisons recording
The only hit version in the UK was by the Dennisons, whose recording reached number 36 on the UK singles chart in 1964.

Releases
The song was recorded several months later by the Rolling Stones in 1964. Unlike most Stones' recordings, the song features harmony vocals on the chorus solely by Brian Jones (most early Stones songs feature Jones and Bill Wyman on backing vocals, with Keith Richards replacing the two not long after), which makes their recording of the song unique in their catalogue.
Many other artists have recorded the song, including Aerosmith, Johnny Rivers, John Cale, Georgie Fame and the Blue Flames, Roger Daltrey, Green Day, Hans Theessink, the Flamin' Groovies, The Kingsmen, The Sonics, The Lincolns, Ace Cannon, Jackie Shane, The Trashmen, Luv'd Ones, Bob Paisley and the Southern Grass and Ratt. It was performed live occasionally by the Grateful Dead in 1966, 1970 and the mid-eighties.

References

1963 singles
Rufus Thomas songs
Aerosmith songs
The Rolling Stones songs
Ratt songs
1963 songs
Stax Records singles
Songs about dogs